Launch on warning (LOW), or fire on warning, is a strategy of nuclear weapon retaliation that gained recognition during the Cold War between the Soviet Union and the United States. With the invention of intercontinental ballistic missiles (ICBMs), launch on warning became an integral part of mutually-assured destruction (MAD) theory. Under the strategy, a retaliatory strike is launched upon warning of enemy nuclear attack while its missiles are still in the air and before detonation occurs. US land-based missiles can reportedly be launched within 5 minutes of a presidential decision to do so and submarine-based missiles within 15 minutes.

History
Before the introduction of intercontinental ballistic missiles (ICBMs), the US Strategic Air Command (SAC) had multiple bombers on patrol at all times in a program known as Operation Chrome Dome. In the event of a Soviet nuclear strike, SAC would order its already-airborne bombers to fly to the other country and to drop their nuclear payload on predetermined targets. The bombers were typically either B-47 Stratojets or B-52 Stratofortresses, and there were three major flight routes. Keeping bombers in the air assured that a second strike would be feasible even if the first strike impaired ground facilities. At the height of the Cold War, the US had special Boeing EC-135 "Looking Glass" aircraft that were equipped as control centers for the nuclear arsenal. The battle staff included a general or flag officer, who was authorized to order a retaliatory strike if the President could not be contacted.

Launch on warning has its roots in US President Dwight Eisenhower's "Positive Control" strategy but really took shape with the introduction of the Minuteman missile. Since many ICBMs, including the Minuteman, were launched from underground silos, the concern arose that a first strike by one nation could destroy the ground launch facilities of the retaliating nation.

In 1997, a US official stated that the US had the technical capability for launch on warning but did not intend to use a launch on warning posture and that the position had not changed in the 1997 presidential decision directive on nuclear weapon doctrine.

The introduction of nuclear-tipped ICBMs required new strategies because unlike bombers, ICBMs cannot be recalled after launch. There were two primary options. One option, "retaliation after ride-out," required the second-strike nation to wait until after it had been attacked to launch its missiles. Some portion of the nuclear arsenal would inevitably be destroyed in such an attack, which led to both superpowers investing heavily in survivable-basing modes for their nuclear forces, including hardened underground missile silos for ICBMs, and submarine-launched ballistic missiles. The other choice was "launch on warning," the launch of nuclear missiles before the other side's missiles could destroy them. That became possible primarily because of improvements in missile technology that allowed for faster launches, along with invention of the Ballistic Missile Early Warning System in the early 1960s, which made it possible for the US to detect the launch of Soviet missiles. The capability was further enhanced in the 1970s with the deployment of space-based launch detection technology on both sides: the American geosynchronous Defense Support Program and Soviet Oko satellites. Evidence found in declassified documents suggests that launch on warning was, at least in part, US policy from the late 1950s to at least the 1970s. The U.S. nuclear weapons employment policy was modified slightly in 1981, stipulating that the U.S. was henceforth "not to rely on launching our nuclear forces in an irrevocable manner" upon receipt of information that a Soviet missile attack was underway, but that the U.S. "must be prepared to launch our recallable bomber forces upon warning that a Soviet nuclear attack has been initiated."

Strategies are available that can reduce the effectiveness of a launch-on-warning stance. For example, the first-strike nation can use a technique, called X-ray pin-down, to delay a retaliatory response. It involves a barrage of submarine-based missiles fired from close range in a "depressed trajectory" mode that reaches its targets in minutes. The warheads would be set to explode every minute or so at high altitudes, which would significantly disrupt the attacked nation's ability to launch its own ICBMs.

See also
Bulletin of the Atomic Scientists
DEFCON
Deterrence theory
Doomsday clock
Fail-deadly
Game theory
Mutually assured destruction
Nash equilibrium
Stanislav Petrov
Doctor Strangelove

References

External links
Launch on Warning History
Nuclear false alarms

Nuclear strategy
Nuclear weapons
Nuclear warfare
Military doctrines